Sir John Fleming, 1st Baronet (born c.1730, died 6 November 1763) was an Irish baronet, created first Baronet Fleming. of Brompton Park in the County of Middlesex in the Baronetage of Great Britain on 22 April 1763.

He married Jane Coleman, daughter of William Coleman and Jane Seymour, in 1753.  His elder daughter Jane married Charles Stanhope, 3rd Earl of Harrington.  His younger daughter Seymour Dorothy Fleming (1758–1818) was involved in a scandalous separation from her husband Sir Richard Worsley.  Lady Fleming remarried in 1770 to a rich sexagenarian born in Barbados, Edwin Lascelles, 1st Baron Harewood.

References

 John Burke and John Bernard Burke, A Genealogical and Heraldic History of the Extinct and Dormant Baronetcies of England, 1841, page 201
 Thomas Wotton, Edward Kimber, Richard A. Johnson, "The baronetage of England: containing a genealogical and historical account of all the English baronets now existing ... illustrated with their coats of arms ... To which is added an account of such Nova Scotia baronets as are of English families; and a dictionary of heraldry", Printed for G. Woodfall (etc.), 1771, volume 2, page 195

1763 deaths
Baronets in the Baronetage of Great Britain